The Mesquite Independent School District is a school district in Mesquite, Texas (USA) (incorporating most of Mesquite and portions of Balch Springs, Dallas, Garland, and Seagoville, as well as formerly serving all high school students of Sunnyvale) which follows the standard definition of an independent school district.

The district contains over 35,000 students.  There are five main high schools, Three of which are AAAAAA (or 6A, the highest in a system of Texas school size classification). As of July 1, 2015, the superintendent is Dr. David Vroonland.

All houses and residential areas in Mesquite ISD are each assigned to an elementary school (Pre-K-5 or K-5), a middle school (6-8), and a high school (9-12).

In addition, the MISD operates two high school football facilities for its high schools, Memorial Stadium near West Mesquite High School (which is the largest high-school football stadium in Texas, seating nearly 20,000 ) and E. H. Hanby Stadium, which is located adjacent to Mesquite High School.

In 2009, the school district was rated "Recognized" by the Texas Education Agency.

Demographics

In 1997, 70.6% of the students were non-Hispanic white; of the four large suburban majority-white suburban school districts in the county, MISD had the highest percentage of white students. From that year to 2016 the number had declined by 68%, making it the most severe decline of the four districts.

From 1997 to 2016 the number of students on free or reduced lunches, a way of classifying a student as low income, increased by 266%.

Standardized dress and dress codes
The district has implemented standardized dress (similar to a school uniform) for middle and high school students, which started with the 2005 to 2006 school year. The districtwide dress code also dictates hair length and acceptable hair styles of male students. It was one of the first Dallas-area school districts to implement a formal dress code, and Karel Holloway of The Dallas Morning News wrote in 2009 that "The district is well-known for its conservative standards for dress". In the 1970s the district sent a boy home from school because his hair touched his collar. This caused national attention.

Radio station KEOM 88.5
Mesquite ISD operates an FM radio station called KEOM 88.5. This is the largest student radio station in the nation

List of schools

Secondary schools

High schools

UIL 6A Schools
 Mesquite High School
 Dr. John D. Horn High School
 Vanguard High School

UIL 5A Schools
 North Mesquite High School
 West Mesquite High School
 Dr. Ralph H. Poteet High School

Middle schools

Grades 6-8

9 in Mesquite, 1 in Balch Springs

A. C. New Middle School (Balch Springs)
Frank B. Agnew Middle School
Judge Frank Berry Middle School
Dr. James P. Terry Middle School
Lanny Frasier Middle School
R. S. Kimbrough Middle School
T. H. McDonald Middle School
Ed F. Vanston Middle School
Walter L. Wilkinson Middle School
Dr. Don P. Woolley Middle School

Elementary schools
27 in Mesquite, 4 in Balch Springs, 1 in Garland, 1 in Dallas
Grades PreK-5
Don Achziger Elementary School
Walter E. Floyd Elementary School (Balch Springs)
W. O. Gray Elementary School (Balch Springs)
John L. Hanby Elementary School
Ed Hodges Elementary School (Balch Springs) 
Sue Ann Mackey Elementary School (Balch Springs)
Ferd A. McWhorter Elementary School
Ben F. Tisinger Elementary School
Dr. Joey Pirrung Elementary School
J. H. Florence Elementary School
Bedford Galloway Elementary School 
Zack Motley Elementary School
G. R. Porter Elementary School
S. M. Seabourn Elementary School
Bonnie Gentry Elementary School

Grades K-5
J. C. Austin Elementary School
C. W. Beasley Elementary School
Florence Black Elementary School
Dr. J. C. Cannaday Elementary School
Dr. Linda Henrie Elementary School (Dallas)
Georgia W. Kimball Elementary School
Joe Lawrence Elementary School
E.S. McKenzie Elementary School
Mary L. Moss Elementary School (1996-97 National Blue Ribbon School)
Vernon Price Elementary School (Garland)
I. N. Range Elementary School
J. C. Rugel Elementary School
Sam Rutherford Elementary School
Elsie Shands Elementary School
Ruby Shaw Elementary School
B. J. Smith Elementary School
Jay Thompson Elementary School
Charles A. Tosch Elementary School

Other
2 in Mesquite
Mesquite Academy, K-12 alternative school
Mesquite Learning Center, K-12 Intervention Center for MIC and Challenge

See also

List of school districts in Texas

References

External links

Mesquite ISD Education Foundation
Standard Dress Code policy information
Neighborhood Park Initiative

School districts in Dallas County, Texas
School districts in Dallas
Mesquite, Texas
Education in Garland, Texas
Education in Dallas
1901 establishments in Texas
School districts established in 1901